Irina Vladimirovna Perevertkina (born 27 October 1967) is a Russian Women ICCF Grandmaster.

Biography
In 1985 Perevertkina graduated from Moscow Secondary School Nr. 905. In 1991 she graduated from Bauman Moscow State Technical University Faculty of Engineering Technology. In 2010 Perevertkina defended the master's degree in Russian State University of Physical Education, Sport, Youth and Tourism. Married, mother of two children. Since 1985 she working as a chess coach and head of department of sports school "Orienta" in Moscow. During many years she is the Moscow Chess Federation's Children's and Youth Committee Chairperson.

She started played to correspondence chess at the age of 6, but two years later participated in her first international tournament. In 2014 Perevertkina won the 9th Ladies World Correspondence Chess Championship (2011–2014), in 2017 she won the 10th Ladies World Correspondence Chess Championship (2014–2017) and in 2020 she won the 11th Ladies World Correspondence Chess Championship (2017–2020).

References

External links
 
 

1967 births
Living people
World Correspondence Chess Champions
Soviet female chess players
Bauman Moscow State Technical University alumni
Russian female chess players
Russian State University of Physical Education, Sport, Youth and Tourism, Department of Chess alumni